The men's 96 kilograms competition at the 2018 World Weightlifting Championships was held on 7 November 2018.

Schedule

Medalists

Records

Results

New records

References

External links
Results 
Results Group A
Results Group B
Results Group C

Men's 96 kg